Ajay Bisaria is a former career diplomat in the Indian Foreign Service. He served as the High Commissioner of India to Canada from March 2020 to June 2022. Earlier, he served as High Commissioner of India to Pakistan from December 2017 to February 2020. Prior to joining the diplomatic service, Bisaria worked briefly with the American Express Bank and Bharat Heavy Electricals Limited in Delhi.

Education
He received his early education in Mumbai and New Delhi. He has a Bachelor’s Degree in Economics from the  St. Stephens College, Delhi University (1980–83), a Master’s degree in Business Administration from the Indian Institute of Management, Kolkata (1983–85) and a Master’s degree in Public Policy from Princeton University (2008 – 09).

Career
After training at the Foreign Service Institute in New Delhi, Ajay Bisaria chose Russian as his language of specialization and was posted at the Indian Embassy in Moscow (1988 – 1991) where he was attached to the economic and political wings of the Embassy. He worked as a Soviet internal affairs specialist in the months leading up to the dissolution of the USSR.

He served as Under Secretary in the Ministry of External Affairs on the East Europe desk (1991 – 92) when India was engaged in building new relationships with the post-Soviet countries.  He then moved to the Ministry of Commerce (1992–95), in the era of economic liberalization. He contributed to a new trade policy paradigm, using his training in economics and finance, as part of a team that managed a complex transition of India’s trade arrangements from a rupee-based to a hard currency regime.

He was posted as First Secretary in the Indian Embassy in Berlin (1995–1999), where he facilitated commercial relations at a time of rising economic engagement between a unifying Germany and a liberalizing India. He also led a project management team to oversee the development and construction of the new building of the Embassy of Indian in Berlin in the historic Tiergarten area.

In 1999, Bisaria was appointed Private Secretary to the Prime Minister of India, Atal Bihari Vajpayee, and served in the role for the whole of Vajpayee's term, until 2004. In addition to managing the office of the Prime Minister as staff officer, he acted as an advisor to Vajpayee on various economic, defence and foreign policy initiatives. He attended more than 50 international summits with the Prime Minister as part of his delegation.

Following his service at the Prime Minister's Office, Bisaria was seconded to the World Bank in Washington D.C. as an Advisor to the Executive Director for South Asia (2004–2008), where he worked on development projects and aid issues, contributing to corporate governance and India’s multilateral economic diplomacy. He was involved in developing a policy approach to enhance India’s rankings in reports on the Ease of Doing Business.

In 2009, Bisaria returned to Delhi to serve as Joint Secretary (Eurasia) in the Ministry of External Affairs (2009–2014). In this role, he coordinated India's foreign policy and bilateral relations with the Eurasia region (including Russia, Ukraine and Central Asia). He was the principal architect behind the United Progressive Alliance government's new policy outlook for India in Central Asia (‘Connect Central Asia’) and coordinated India’s approach to six annual Indo-Russian summits, including the first annual summit between Prime Minister Modi and President Putin in India in December 2014. Additionally, he led the development of the India-Russia ‘special and privileged strategic partnership’. He also worked on India’s relationship with multilateral institutions like the Shanghai Cooperation Organisation, including managing India's application to join the group, and led India's participation in the Russia–India–China trilateral dialogue.

In January 2015, Bisaria was appointed India’s Ambassador to Poland, based in Warsaw, with concurrent accreditation to Lithuania, serving until November 2017. During his time in Poland, he focused on forging economic partnerships and deepening India’s cultural footprint in Central and Eastern Europe. He also served as India’s representative in the Warsaw-based Community of Democracies, participating in the Community meetings in Warsaw, Geneva and New York.

As High Commissioner to Pakistan 
From December 2017 to February 2020, Bisaria served as India's High Commissioner to Pakistan. During his tenure, Pakistan and India experienced a decline in bilateral relations – arising from increased violence and terrorism emanating from Pakistan, particularly in the contested region of Kashmir. He was in Pakistan at the time of a terrorist attack by the Pakistan-based Jaish-e-Muhammad in Pulwama, which culminated in the Balakot airstrike, the first instance of aerial combat between Indian and Pakistani air forces since the Bangladesh Liberation War in 1971. Prior to these events, however, Bisaria helped India establish a relationship with the newly-elected Tehreek-i-Insaf Government of Prime Minister Imran Khan. He also worked on efforts to expand Indian nationals' access to the Kartarpur Corridor. He returned to India in August 2019, when Pakistan downgraded its bilateral relationship with India. He retained the designation of High Commissioner of India to Pakistan based in India, till February 2020.

In the Indian Civil Service, Bisaria held the rank of Secretary to the Government of India. He was part of the team representing India at the United Nations Human Rights Council, Geneva in September 2019, to promote India’s record on human rights.

As High Commissioner to Canada 
In March 2020, Bisaria was appointed High Commissioner to Canada. Bisaria's tenure began during the COVID-19 pandemic and involved facilitating the repatriation of Indian nationals under the Vande Bharat scheme ‘air bubble’. He received a shipment of Indian vaccines sent to Canada in March 2021, along with then Minister for Procurement of Canada, Anita Anand. This gesture under India’s Vaccine Maitri program, created greater trust and friendship in India’s strategic ties with Canada. Through his tenure, Bisaria worked on the India-Canada economic corridor, stating publicly that the economic partnership should drive the political relationship. He has advocated stronger economic ties ‘between the two Indo-Pacific democracies and G-20 economies’. He is credited with developing strong connections with CEO’s and leaders of Canadian pension funds and investment firms, which have ratcheted up investments to over USD 60 billion in India, particularly in the infrastructure sector. In this period, several major Canadian firms also stepped up FDI in India. He has pushed for an India-Canada early progress trade agreement which may be finalised in 2022.

References

External links

High Commissioners of India to Pakistan
Indian Institute of Management Calcutta alumni
Living people
Princeton School of Public and International Affairs alumni
St. Stephen's College, Delhi alumni
Indian Foreign Service officers
Ambassadors of India to Lithuania
Ambassadors of India to Poland
Year of birth missing (living people)